William Wesley Hicks (July 9, 1843 – September 23, 1925) was an American politician. He served as a Democratic member of the Louisiana House of Representatives.

Hicks was born in Darlington County, South Carolina. In 1900, he was elected to the Louisiana House of Representatives, succeeding McIntyre H. Sandlin. Hicks was succeeded by E. L. Stewart in 1904. After that, he served as a member of the Webster Parish Police Jury from 1904 to 1908.

Hicks died in September 1925 in Shongaloo, Louisiana, at the age of 82. He was buried in Gilgal Cemetery.

References 

1843 births
1925 deaths
People from Darlington County, South Carolina
Democratic Party members of the Louisiana House of Representatives
20th-century American politicians
Burials in Louisiana
Parish jurors and commissioners in Louisiana